Wizard Wars is a reality competition show in which teams of magicians create and perform original magic routines before a live studio audience. Their acts are judged on creativity, deception, and showmanship. Vegas headliners Penn & Teller head up the judging panel, alongside magic critic Christen Gerhart and World Champion of Magic Jason Latimer. Wizard Wars also features four "home team" magicians—the "Wizards"—who return every week to take on new teams of "challengers." Wizards include street magician Justin Flom, stage illusionist David Shimshi, mentalist Angela Funovits, and con man Gregory Wilson. The series premiered August 19, 2014

Wizard Wars was created in 2012 by Vegas-based magic consultant Rick Lax and street magician Justin Flom. Flom filmed the original Wizard Wars pilot in Lax's apartment, on a $15 budget. The competing magicians created routines with placemats, beach balls, colored erasers and fake oranges. Flom's YouTube video, featured on Wired.com and BoingBoing.com, caught the eye of production company A. Smith & Co., who worked with Lax and Flom to sell the show to the Syfy network. Flom now stars in the show as a "Wizard"; Lax works behind the scene as a producer and magic consultant.

Notable magicians appearing on Wizard Wars include Kyle Marlett, Las Vegas headliners, Murray SawChuck, Tommy Wind, Nathan Burton, Greg Dow and John Stessel, America's Got Talents Leon Etienne, and Naathan Phan.

Over a million people watched the Wizard Wars series premiere. The episode highlighted Canadian illusionists Chris Funk and Ekaterina, who ended up losing the "Wizard War" to "Wizards" Gregory Wilson and Justin Flom.

Speaking on behalf of Flom and himself, Lax said this of the Internet-to-series premier journey: “The most unlikely part of the YouTube-video-to-Syfy-show transition was that the original Wizard Wars vision stayed in shape...Everyone told me, ‘Hollywood is going to tear your idea apart,’ but that didn't happen. Only thing that happened was the magic got bigger and better.”

Wizard Wars maintained "very solid ratings" and was renewed for another six episodes. In these six episodes ("Season 1.5") former Challenger Billy Kidd joins the cast as a full-fledged Wizard.

Behind-The-Scenes

In August 2014 Wired (website) offered viewers a behind-the-scenes look at Season 1 of Wizard Wars.

Episode list

Season 1 (2014)

References

External links
 Syfy channel Wizard Wars page

2010s American reality television series
American television magic shows
2014 American television series debuts
2015 American television series endings
Syfy original programming